Kokumin no Tomo (国民之友; The People's Friend) was a Japanese language political and general interest magazine existed between 1887 and 1898, and therefore, one of the periodicals of the Meiji period. The magazine was headquartered in Tokyo, Japan. It was one of the earliest examples of independent and coherent intellectual magazines in Japan.

History and profile
Kokumin no Tomo was established by Tokutomi Soho in 1887. The first issue appeared on 15 February 1887. It was modelled on the American news magazine, The Nation.

The publisher of Kokumin no Tomo was Min'yūsha, a publishing company also founded by Tokutomi Soho which was based in Tokyo. Although the magazine mostly covered politics, it also published articles on literary and cultural topics. Kokumin no Tomo had several supplements. Several examples of the ancient and modern Eastern and Western poems were first featured in one of these supplements dated August 1889 which are called Omokage, verses emerged in the Meiji period.

One of the regular contributors of Kokumin no Tomo was Yamaji Aizan. The magazine folded in 1898.

References

1887 establishments in Japan
1898 disestablishments in Japan
Defunct literary magazines published in Japan
Defunct political magazines published in Japan
Independent magazines
Magazines established in 1887
Magazines disestablished in 1898
Magazines published in Tokyo
Poetry literary magazines

Further reading